Kashdan is a surname. People with that name include:

 George Kashdan (1928-2006), American comic book writer and editor
 Isaac Kashdan (1905-1985), American chess grandmaster and chess writer
 John Kashdan (1917-2001), English painter, printmaker and teacher
 Todd Kashdan, American scientist, public speaker, and professor of psychology

See also